Alva Edward Garey (June 2, 1883 – September 9, 1971) was an American educator, soldier, and politician.

Background 
Garey was born on June 2, 1883, in Porter, Wisconsin. He was educated in the public school at Stebbinsville. He farmed, took the University of Wisconsin's short course in agriculture as a correspondence course on the farm, studied at Milton Academy, and graduated with a
B. A. degree from Milton College. In 1917 he received his law degree from the University of Georgia. During World War I, Garey enlisted in the United States Army as a private, reaching the rank of captain. After the war, he went into the United States Army Reserve as a major, and would eventually reach the rank of colonel.

He started legal practice in Edgerton. In June 1920, he received an M.A. degree from the University of Wisconsin, having finished his coursework after the war.

Political office 
In 1922, Garey was elected to represent the newly-apportioned 15th district of the Wisconsin State Senate (Rock County) from 1923 to 1926. He was a Republican, and was unopposed.

Civil service and later years 
Wisconsin Governor Philip La Follette appointed Garey Wisconsin state director of personnel and he instituted reforms for the Wisconsin civil service. In 1936, Garey was one of the founders of the American Federation of State, County and Municipal Employees. Garey died on September 9, 1971, in a nursing home in Monona, Wisconsin.

References

External links

1883 births
1971 deaths
20th-century American politicians
Republican Party Wisconsin state senators
Military personnel from Wisconsin
United States Army colonels
United States Army personnel of World War I
Milton College alumni
Milton College faculty
University of Wisconsin–Madison alumni
University of Georgia alumni
Wisconsin lawyers
American Federation of State, County and Municipal Employees people
People from Edgerton, Wisconsin
20th-century American lawyers